Following the Kitchener Reforms of 1903 during the British Raj, the  Commander-in-Chief, India, enjoyed control of the Army of India and answered to the civilian Viceroy of India. The Commander-in-Chief's staff was overseen by the Chief of the General Staff. General Headquarters India (GHQ India) was based in Calcutta and Simla (the winter capital of the Raj) until the seat of power moved to New Delhi in 1911.

In addition to India, it was responsible at varying periods for parts of the Middle East (in particular Aden Settlement and, later, Aden Colony, as well as Iraq and Persia). For significant periods before the creation of South East Asia Command (SEAC) in 1943, the C-in-C India was also responsible for Ceylon and Burma.

The Commander-in-Chief, India, had some 2,000 officers and 2.5 million troops under his command in 1945. GHQ India was redesignated Army HQ in 1947 when India was partitioned.

Second World War
Following a review by the British Chiefs of Staff in late 1939, operational control of troops in Iraq passed in early 1940 to Middle East Command although the provision of troops and their maintenance remained for the most part GHQ India's responsibility. In March 1941, in the period before the Anglo-Iraqi War, the C-in-C Middle East General Archibald Wavell, who was preoccupied with existing problems in his theatre, gained approval for Iraq to come under India's operational control again but once hostilities commenced in May Wavell was obliged by London reluctantly to reassume responsibility. In June 1941, after cessation of hostilities, control reverted once more to GHQ India. India finally relinquished responsibility for Persia and Iraq in August 1942 when a separate Persia and Iraq Command was created.

In December 1941 Burma, which had been under the operational control of Far East Command in Singapore, was transferred to India Command. After the dissolution of ABDACOM in February 1942 the C-in-C India also became responsible for Ceylon. During this period, some Chinese and American units also came under the operational control of the India Command. These responsibilities remained unchanged until the creation of South East Asia Command (SEAC) in August 1943.

With the creation of SEAC there were three separate operational commands. The China Theatre was  under the command of Generalissimo Chiang Kai-shek. SEAC was an Anglo-American command under a Supreme Allied Commander, Lord Mountbatten, who was responsible for operations in Burma, Ceylon, Malaya and Sumatra. India Command, under General Auchinleck Commander-in-Chief, India, was responsible for the development of India as a base, for internal security in India and the defence of India's North West Frontier. India Command's base responsibility included the training, equipping, maintenance and movement of operational forces assigned to SEAC.

Notes

References

External links
 OPERATIONS IN THE FAR EAST From 17 October, 1940 To 27 December 1941

Command
Commands of the British Army
Com